Charles Tait may refer to:
 Charles Tait (politician)
 Charles Tait (film director)
 Charles Tait (bowls)